Let Me Go, Let Me Go, Let Me Go is the second full-length solo album by Jason Molina, released under his own name. It was recorded in Bloomington, Indiana, at The Projects by Jim Zespy during July 2004.  The record was released on August 22, 2006, on Secretly Canadian Records.

Track listing
 "It's Easier Now" – 4:01
 "Everything Should Try Again" – 4:15
 "Alone With the Owl" – 2:24
 "Don't It Look Like Rain" – 3:48
 "Some Things Never Try" – 2:11
 "It Must Be Raining There Forever" – 3:32
 "Get Out Get Out Get Out" – 3:27
 "It Costs You Nothing" – 3:59
 "Let Me Go Let Me Go Let Me Go" – 6:39

References

2006 albums
Jason Molina albums
Secretly Canadian albums